Julia Hills (born 3 April 1957) is an English actress, known for portraying the role of Rona in all eight series of the BBC sitcom 2point4 Children. She also portrayed various roles in Channel 4's first late night satirical sketch show Who Dares Wins, Beryl in two series of the sitcom Dad and Caroline Joyner in Casualty.

Early life and career
Hills was born in Nottingham and is a former member of the Royal Shakespeare Company where she played many leading roles including Sally Forth in the premiere of Peter Nichols' musical Poppy. Perdita in The Winter's Tale and Diana in All's Well That Ends Well directed by Trevor Nunn. She also played Edwin Drood in the New York Shakespeare Theatre production of The Mystery of Edwin Drood at the Savoy Theatre in 1987 working with Lulu and Ernie Wise. She went to Walton high school, Stafford, Staffordshire.

Theatre work
Hills was nominated for an Olivier Award (Actress of the Year in a Musical) in 1984 for her performance as Emily Tallentire in Howard Goodall and Melvyn Bragg's musical The Hired Man.

Other theatre credits include Eve in Flying Under Bridges by Sandi Toksvig adapted by Sarah Daniels (Watford Palace Theatre), Betty in Larkin with Women (Coventry Belgrade), Vera in Stepping Out (New Vic Theatre Stoke), The Hired Man (Leicester Haymarket and West End), A Midsummer Night's Dream (RSC Stratford and Barbican) Rusty in Our Friends in the North by Peter Flannery (RSC Newcastle and Barbican), The Witch of Edmonton (RSC Stratford), Beside Herself by Sarah Daniels (Royal Court), We The Undersigned, Dealing With Clair by Martin Crimp (Orange Tree Richmond), Toine in Piaf, Beauty and the Beast, Guys and Dolls, The Tempest, Sylvia Raven in Shaw'sThe Philanderer, Beside The Sea, Susannah in Alan Ayckbourn's Bedroom Farce, A Mad World my Masters, Dorcas Frey in David Hare's Plenty (Bristol Old Vic), A Midsummer Night's Dream (Bristol Old Vic and London Old Vic), Brecht's Mr Puntila and his Man Matti, Does This Train Stop at Southend? (Stratford East), Bunty Mainwaring in Coward's The Vortex, Shore Saints and Sea Devils (Library Theatre Manchester), Fertility Dance (Nuffield Southampton), Jack and the Beanstalk (York Theatre Royal) and two national tours of Who Dares Wins – Sex and Drugs and Sausage Roll. From February 2009 she took part in a nationwide tour of Calendar Girls before it moved to the Noël Coward Theatre from 3 April 2009.

In recent years, she has appeared as Mrs Eynsford-Hill in Pygmalion at Manchester's Royal Exchange theatre and rejoined the tour of Calendar Girls to play the role of Annie. She played Amy Ruskin in Special Occasions at The Mill Theatre Sonning playing opposite her husband Paul Clarkson and then played Homily Clock in The Borrowers at The Nuffield Theatre Southampton. She completed sell out seasons at Shakespeare at the Tobacco Factory in Bristol garnering five star reviews for her performances as Goneril in King Lear and Madame Ranevskaya in The Cherry Orchard both directed by Andrew Hilton and then moved to the Everyman Theatre, Cheltenham where she performed in Tennessee Williams' The Glass Menagerie playing Amanda Wingfield. She has played the part of Kath in Entertaining Mr Sloane by Joe Orton at Curve Leicester and Toine in Piaf directed by Paul Kerryson. She has played Margaret in Springs Eternal by Susan Glaspell at The Orange Tree Theatre Richmond directed by Sam Walters and Worst Wedding Ever by Chris Chibnall at the Salisbury Playhouse.  In 2019, she created the role of Dolly Bantry for the first-ever English stage adaptation of Agatha Christie's The Mirror Crack'd for Wales Millennium Centre directed by Melly Still which toured in the UK and Ireland.

Television work
Hills has appeared in many TV shows, such as in 2point4 Children in which she played Rona for the show's 8 series run on BBC1 (1991–1999). She also starred as all of the women and even some of the male characters in the Channel 4 comedy series Who Dares Wins (1984–88). She has appeared as Caroline Joyner in hospital drama Casualty (2004–2005), and previously in the series as Carol Simpson for one 1993 episode.

She also starred in Ladies in Charge for 6 episodes in 1986 and shared a leading role with Kevin McNally in BBC sitcom Dad as Beryl Hook for 13 episodes (1997–1999) over 2 series. Dad was written by Andrew Marshall who also created 2point4 Children. She has also appeared as herself on The Good Sex Guide in 1993 and The Alan Titchmarsh Show in 2009.

Hills is also known for playing Annabelle Shrivener in The Archers as well as appearing in numerous other radio series and plays. Her films include Homeground (1982). In February 2022, she portrayed the role of Susan Rutherford in the BBC soap opera Doctors.

Personal life
Hills is married to actor and director Paul Clarkson, who played John Tallentire in The Hired Man. The couple have three children; including actor Stewart Clarke and comedian Abi Clarke.

Filmography

Television
The Lost Tribe (1980)
Goodbye Days (1984)
Who Dares Wins (1984–1988)
Storyboard (1985)
The Lenny Henry Show (1985)
Ladies in Charge (1986)
The Refuge (1987)
The Bretts (1988)
Boon (1990)
The Upper Hand (1991)
Haggard (1992)
2point4 Children (1991–1999)
Dad (1997–1999)
Peak Practice (2000)
Doctors (2002)
Murphy's Law (2003)
Trevor's World of Sport (2003)
Star (2003)
Murder in Suburbia (2004)
Wipe Out (2004)
Casualty (1993, 2004–5)
All in the Game (2006)
Doctors (2010)
Outnumbered (2010)
Boomers (2016)
EastEnders (2018)
Doctors (2022)

Radio
Falco
Revolting People
Julie and the Prince
Earth Song
It Started With a Click
Dealing With Clair
The Culper Tapes
Saturday Night Fry
The Rainbow Bridge
Gilbert Without Sullivan
The Lost Child
The Walsall Boys
Book at Bedtime
Our Man in Havana
Life Death and Sex with Sue and Mike
The Long Hot Satsuma

References

External links
 
 Julia Hills' website

English television actresses
Actors from Nottingham
1957 births
Living people
Actresses from Nottinghamshire
English stage actresses
English musical theatre actresses
English radio actresses